The Lazarev Coast is a coastal area in Antarctic. It is located on the southern side of the Bellingshausen Sea, on the Peter I Island.

The 19 km long coast from the W point of cape Eva in the N, to the point of Zavodovskijbreen in the S, W on Peter I øy. After lieutenant Mikhail P. Lazarev, commander of the sloop Mirnyj on the first Russian Antarctic expedition 1819-21, which discovered the island 20. January 1821.

External links
 Lazarevkysten // Scientific Committee on Antarctic Research (SCAR)
 Lazarew Küste // Scientific Committee on Antarctic Research (SCAR)
 Lazarevkysten Stadnamn i norske polarområde, Norsk Polarinstitutt
 Lazarevkysten at GeoNames.Org (cc-by)

Coasts of Antarctica
Peter I Island